Haldar is a surname or a title. Notable people with the surname include:

Asit Kumar Haldar (1890–1964), Indian painter
Debshankar Haldar (born 1965), Indian actor
Indrani Haldar (born 1971), Indian actress
Sucharu Ranjan Haldar (born 1940), Indian politician

See also
Halfar